Lance Cameron Gunn (born January 9, 1970) is a former American football defensive back who played in the National Football League and NFL Europe.

Early years 
Gunn grew up in an east suburb of Houston, Texas. He attended North Shore High School in Cloverleaf, Texas, and played high school football there.

College career 
Gunn played college football at the University of Texas in Austin, Texas where he pledged the Epsilon Iota chapter of Alpha Phi Alpha. He red-shirted his freshman year in 1988, then played three seasons for head coach David McWilliams (1989–91), and his senior season (1992) for head coach John Mackovic. His sophomore season in 1990, Texas won the Southwest Conference and finished the regular season ranked No. 3. Gunn was a three-time All-SWC selection (1989–91) and named an All-American safety in 1992.

College stats include 298 tackles (188 solo) and six QB sacks. He led the Longhorns in interceptions with five in 1991 and tied for the lead in blocked kicks in 1992. He graduated from UT in 1993 with a marketing degree.

Professional career 
Gunn was drafted by Cincinnati Bengals with the seventh pick of the seventh round of the 1993 NFL Draft. He played one season for the Bengals, starting eight games. Gunn also played for the Frankfurt Galaxy in the NFL Europe league. His football career ended in the spring of 1997 after donating a kidney to his ailing father.

References

External links
Just Sports Stats

Living people
1970 births
Players of American football from Missouri
American football defensive backs
African-American players of American football
Texas Longhorns football players
Cincinnati Bengals players
Frankfurt Galaxy players
North Shore Senior High School (Texas) alumni
21st-century African-American sportspeople
20th-century African-American sportspeople